The following is a list of the fajãs of the islands of the Azores:

Faial
 

 Fajã do Varadouro (Castelo Branco, Horta)
 Fajã da Praia do Norte (Praia do Norte, Horta)

Flores

 Fajã de Lopo Vaz (Lajes, Lajes das Flores)
 Fajã da Ponta Ruiva (Cedros, Santa Cruz das Flores
 Fajã do Conde (Santa Cruz, Santa Cruz das Flores)

Graciosa

 Fajã da Folga
 Fajã da Beira Mar

Pico

 Fajã da Baixa  (Piedade, Lajes do Pico)
 Fajã do Calhau (Piedade, Lajes do Pico)

São Jorge

 Fajã d'Alem (Norte Grande, Velas)
 Fajã da Abelheira
 Fajã da Betesga
 Fajã da Caldeira de Cima
 Fajã da Caldeira de Santo Cristo
 Fajã da Choupana
 Fajã da Ermida (Rosais, Velas)
 Fajã da Fonte do Nicolau
 Fajã da Fragueira
 Fajã da Neca
 Fajã Pelada (Velas, Velas)
 Fajã da Penedia
 Fajã da Ponta Furada
 Fajã do Mero (Norte Pequeno, Calheta)
 Fajã da Ponta Nova
 Fajã da Ribeira da Areia
 Fajã da Ribeira Funda
 Fajã da Rocha (Fajã da Coqueira)
 Fajã da Saramagueira
 Fajã da Vereda Vermelha
 Fajã das Almas
 Fajã das Barreiras
 Fajã das Cubas (Fajã da Baleia)
 Fajã das Fajanetas
 Fajã das Feiteiras
 Fajã das Funduras
 Fajã das Pontas
 Fajã de Além
 Fajã de Entre Poios (Velas, Velas)
 Fajã de Entre Ribeiras
 Fajã de Fernando Afonso (Rosais, Velas)
 Fajã de João Dias (Rosais, Velas)
 Fajã de Manuel Teixeira
 Fajã de Santo Amaro
 Fajã de São João (Santo Antão, Calheta)
 Fajã de Vasco Martins
 Fajã do Belo (Ribeira Seca, Calheta)
 Fajã do Boi (Rosais, Velas)
 Fajã do Calhau Rolado (Rosais, Velas)
 Fajã do Caminho do Meio
 Fajã do Canto
 Fajã do Cardoso
 Fajã do Castelhano
 Fajã do Cavalete
 Fajã do Centeio (Rosais, Velas)
 Fajã do Cerrado das Silvas (Velas, Velas)
 Fajã do Cruzal
 Fajã do Ginjal
 Fajã do Labaçal
 Fajã do Lemos
 Fajã do Negro
 Fajã do Norte Estreito
 Fajã do Norte das Fajãs
 Fajã do Nortezinho
 Fajã do Salto Verde
 Fajã do Sanguinhal
 Fajã do Ouvidor
 Fajã do Pedregalo (Rosais, Velas)
 Fajã do Valado (Rosais, Velas)
 Fajã dos Azevinhos
 Fajã dos Bodes
 Fajã dos Cubres (Ribeira Seca, Calheta)
 Fajã dos Tijolos (Ribeira Seca, Calheta)
 Fajã dos Vimes
 Fajã Amaro da Cunha (Rosais, Velas)
 Fajã Chã
 Fajã Fajanzinha
 Fajã Isabel Pereira
 Fajã Maria Pereira (Rosais, Velas)
 Fajã Mata Sete (Rosais, Velas)
 Fajã Rasa
 Fajã Redonda

São Miguel

 Fajã do Araújo (Nordeste, Nordeste)
 Fajã do Calhau (Água Retorta, Povoação)

Terceira

 Fajã do Fischer
 Fajãzinha
 Fajã da Serreta

References
 
 
 
 

fajas